Daniela Ramos Lalinde (born February 8, 1988) is a Colombian designer, model and beauty pageant titleholder who won Miss Mundo Colombia 2009 and represented Colombia at Miss World 2009 where she placed Top 7.

References

Living people
1988 births
People from Bogotá
Colombian female models
Miss World 2009 delegates
Colombian beauty pageant winners